Hendrik Jan Davids and Libor Pimek were the defending champions, but lost in the first round this year.

David Adams and Andrei Olhovskiy won in the final, 6–3, 7–5, against Menno Oosting and Udo Riglewski.

Seeds

  Danie Visser /  Laurie Warder (first round)
  Steve DeVries /  David Macpherson (first round)
  Tom Nijssen /  Cyril Suk (quarterfinals)
  Jacco Eltingh /  Paul Haarhuis (quarterfinals)

Draw

Draw

References

External links
Draw

Doubles